Charles Sumner Pendleton (March 28, 1880 – July 15, 1952) was an American Republican politician who served as a member of the Virginia Senate, representing the state's 2nd district.

Political career
After serving in the House of Delegates, Pendleton was elected to the state senate in 1919. He resigned after a year and a half into his term to accept appointment as the Federal Prohibition Director for Virginia, serving in that position from June 7, 1921 to December 31, 1926.

References

External links
 
 

1880 births
1952 deaths
Republican Party members of the Virginia House of Delegates
Republican Party Virginia state senators
People from Gate City, Virginia
20th-century American politicians